Events in the year 2019 in Puerto Rico.

Incumbents
 President: Donald Trump (Republican)
 Governor: Ricardo Rosselló (until August 2), Wanda Vázquez Garced (starting August 2)
 Resident Commissioner: Jenniffer González

Events
July–August: Summer revolution initiated by leaked chats lead to resignation of Ricardo Rosselló as governor of the Commonwealth, the placement of Pedro Pierluisi as interim governor which was vacated by a 9-0 Puerto Rico Supreme Court decision, and the inauguration of Wanda Vázquez Garced as the 13th Constitutional Governor of the Commonwealth.
October 14: The Ernesto Ramos Antonini public housing residence, located near the University of Puerto Rico, Río Piedras Campus, was the site of a mass killing with more than 1000 shots fired and six people dead.

Sports
Continued from 2018: The 2018–19 Liga Puerto Rico

Deaths

10 January – Kevin Fret, musician (b. 1994).
12 February – Pedro Morales, professional wrestler and commentator (b. 1942).

References

 
2010s in Puerto Rico
Years of the 21st century in Puerto Rico
Puerto Rico
Puerto Rico